Bulo Bulo is a town in central Bolivia, in Cochabamba Department.

Transport 
 It is served by Bulo Bulo Airport.
 In 2013, a railway connection to Montero is proposed.

See also 

List of reduplicated place names

External links 
Google Maps - Bulo Bulo
OpenStreetMap - Bulo Bulo

Populated places in Cochabamba Department